This is a list of rail accidents in Greece.

List

See also 
 List of rail accidents
 List of rail accidents by country

References

Sources
 

 
Greece